St. Albans Township is one of the 25 townships of Licking County, Ohio, United States. As of the 2010 census, the total population was 2,446, up from 2,060 at the 2000 census. As of 2010, the population living in the unincorporated portion of the township was 1,929.

Geography
Located in the western part of the county, it borders the following townships and city:
Liberty Township - north
McKean Township - northeast corner
Granville Township - east
Union Township - southeast corner
Harrison Township - south
Pataskala - southwest corner
Jersey Township - west
Monroe Township - northwest corner

The village of Alexandria is located in central St. Albans Township.

Name and history
It is the only St. Albans Township statewide.

Government
The township is governed by a three-member board of trustees, who are elected in November of odd-numbered years to a four-year term beginning on the following January 1. Two are elected in the year after the presidential election and one is elected in the year before it. There is also an elected township fiscal officer, who serves a four-year term beginning on April 1 of the year after the election, which is held in November of the year before the presidential election. Vacancies in the fiscal officership or on the board of trustees are filled by the remaining trustees.

References

External links

County website

Townships in Licking County, Ohio
Townships in Ohio